"To Kosciusko" is the name shared by three sonnets written by Samuel Taylor Coleridge,  Leigh Hunt, and John Keats. Coleridge's, the original, was written in December 1794 and published in the 16 December 1794 Morning Chronicle as the fifth of his Sonnets on Eminent Characters series. Hunt and Keats were inspired to follow his poem with their own versions (under the same title) in November 1815 and December 1816, respectively. The sonnets were dedicated to heroism of Tadeusz Kościuszko, leader of the 1794 Polish rebellion against Prussian and Russian control.

Background
Towards the end of 1794, Coleridge began writing a series of sonnets called Sonnets on Eminent Characters. The first sonnet, "To Erskine", was printed on 1 December in the Morning Chronicle, and 10 more sonnets followed. Coleridge's sonnet "To Kosciusko" was the fifth in the series, printed on 16 December. The poem was revised twice, first for a 1796 collection and then for an 1828 collection of Coleridge's poems. It remained in that final form for the two collections that followed, in 1829 and 1834.

Kosciusko was a Polish national who led Poland in rebellion against two countries, Prussia and Russia, during the spring of 1794. When the rebellion was crushed by that October, he was captured by Russian forces and held as a prisoner. Coleridge knew few details about the specifics, and altered his poem when he found out that Kosciusko was merely wounded and captured instead of being killed.

The British Romantic poets favoring of Kosciusko as a hero can be traced to Coleridge, and Leigh Hunt published his own sonnet on Kosciusko in the 19 November 1815 Examiner. Following this, Keats wrote his version of the sonnet in December 1816 and published it in the 16 February 1817 examiner.

Poem
The 1796 edition of the poem reads:

Coleridge's uncertainty of Kosciusko's state after the defeat of the Polish rebellion is shown in the original 3rd and 4th line:

For the 1828 edition and later printings of the poem, the final lines read:

Hunt
Hunt, like Coleridge, saw Kosciusko as a hero, and Hunt admired Kosciusko for his character during the Polish rebellion and, as the subtitle suggests, his having "never fought either for Buonaparte or the allies". Hunt's version reads:

Keats
Following Coleridge's poem, Keats wrote his own sonnet called "To Kosciusko". Keats's version reads:

Themes
Kosciusko was a hero to Coleridge as a patriot, even though Kosciusko was Polish and many of Coleridge's political heroes were British. Hunt and Keats viewed Kosciusko as a political ideal that was connected to King Alfred, a figure twho was believed to have established English constitutional liberty.

The praise within the poem is similar to how Coleridge praised Fayette; he believed that both were political prisoners who were martyred for their beliefs. Coleridge discussed Kosciusko and the issues surrounding Poland in many of his works, including during a lecture series that Coleridge gave in 1795 and articles within Coleridge's newspaper, Watchman.

The first four lines of Coleridge's poem are related in style to Thomas Campbell's The Pleasures of Hope, with the line "And Freedom shriek'd when Koskiusko fell" in particular. However, Campbell did not come up with the phrasing on his own. Instead, he based his phrasing on an ode by John Dennis with a line that reads, "Fair Liberty shriek'd out aloud, aloud Religion groan'd".

Notes

References
 Ashton, Rosemary. The Life of Samuel Taylor Coleridge. Oxford: Blackwell, 1997.
 Davies, Damian and Liu, Alan. Romanticism, History, Historicism. New York, Routledge, 2009.
 Feldman, Paula and Robinson, Daniel. A Century of Sonnets. Oxford: Oxford University Press, 2002.
 Mays, J. C. C. (editor). The Collected Works of Samuel Taylor Coleridge: Poetical Works I Vol I.I. Princeton: Princeton University Press, 2001.
 Roe, Nicholas. John Keats and the Culture of Dissent. Oxford : Clarendon Press, 1997.

External links
 
 - Official website – Official website about Mt Kosciuszko

1794 poems
Sonnets on Eminent Characters
British poems
Tadeusz Kościuszko
Works originally published in the Morning Chronicle